Publishers Group West (PGW) is a book distributor founded in 1976 in Berkeley, California, which distributes to bookstores in the U.S. and internationally. They were the largest distributor of independent presses in the U.S. in the 1990s. In 2007, PGW was acquired by Perseus Books Group. They are the exclusive distributor for over 100 publishers. Some of their former publishers were picked up for direct distribution by Perseus Books Group and others in 2007. Periodic additions to their list of publishers include an additional 5 added in 2012. Within the book business, they are known for throwing a party at the annual BookExpo convention, with musical performers including Ivan Neville's Dumpstaphunk and Chaka Khan in 2012.

Perseus' distribution business was acquired by Ingram Content Group in 2016.

Partial list of publishers 

 2.13.61
 Agate Publishing
 Archaia Studios Press
 Baker & Taylor Publishing Group
 Bilingual Books
 Black Classic Press
 Blast Books
 Classical Comics
 Cleis Press
 Counterpoint
 Frances Lincoln Publishers
 Grove/Atlantic, Inc., publisher of Cold Mountain, New York Times Bestseller
 Grove Press
 Heyday Books
 Hunter House
 Keen Communications
 McSweeney's
 Milkweed Editions
 New World Library
 Night Shade Books (added 2012)
 Open City (defunct)
 Open Court Publishing Company
 Parallax Press, publisher of works by Thich Nhat Hanh
 Quest Books
 Re/Search
 Ronin Publishing
 Scarletta Press
 Seal Press
 Sierra Club Books
 Soft Skull Press
 TalentSmart, publishers of Emotional Intelligence 2.0
 Three Rooms Press
 Thunder Bay Press
 Tin House Books
 Urantia Foundation
 Wilderness Press
 Wisdom Publications

Publishers formerly distributed by PGW 

 NBM Publishing (1986-1988)
 Demos Medical Publishing, aka Demos Health (2005-2013)

References

External links 

 Publishers Group West website

Book distributors
Book publishing companies based in Berkeley, California
Distribution companies of the United States
American companies established in 1976
Publishing companies established in 1976
1976 establishments in California